Philip David Allott (born December 1959) is a British politician who served as the Police, Fire and Crime Commissioner for North Yorkshire, England. He was elected in May 2021, taking over the job from fellow Conservative Julia Mulligan on 13 May. He resigned on 15 October 2021 and left office on the following day.

Life
Allott attended King James's School in Knaresborough. He studied law at Leeds Metropolitan University as a mature student, and is married with a son and a daughter. Allott was a leader of the Conservatives on Harrogate Borough Council. He had previously served in the Territorial Army, and at the age of 25, was elected Mayor of Knaresborough, the youngest mayor in the country at that time. He had unsuccessfully stood in several general elections for the Conservative Party, contesting the Leeds West constituency in 1987, Brent North in 2001, Bolton West in 2005, and Halifax in both 2010 and 2015.

Allott has written a book, The Donkeyman, detailing his father's business in breeding and racing donkeys in the 1950s and 1960s.

Police, Fire and Crime Commissioner
In May 2021, Allott stood as the Conservative Party candidate in the North Yorkshire Police, Fire and Crime Commissioner election and was elected after winning 55.69% of votes in the second round. He assumed the role on 13 May, replacing the previous commissioner, Julia Mulligan. Prior to being elected, he was the managing director of a public relations and marketing agency.

In October 2021, he was criticised for his remarks on the murder of Sarah Everard. She had been abducted, raped, and killed by a police officer who had falsely arrested her in March. Allott had urged women to be "streetwise", to "learn a bit about that legal process". He initially defended his comments as he intended to "inform women far better of their rights" before later apologising. Labour Party leader Keir Starmer, Conservative MP for Skipton and Ripon Julian Smith, and The Northern Echo and The Yorkshire Post newspapers called for his resignation. The North Yorkshire Police, Fire and Crime Panel, which lacks the ability to remove the commissioner, passed a unanimous vote of no confidence in him on 14 October, calling on him to "resign immediately". Allott initially refused, responding that he thought he would be able to "regain trust", but later the same day tendered his resignation from his post.

His successor was elected at the 2021 North Yorkshire Police, Fire and Crime Commissioner by-election.

References

External links
North Yorkshire Police, Fire & Crime Commissioner

Police and crime commissioners in England
Living people
Conservative Party (UK) councillors
Conservative Party (UK) parliamentary candidates
Conservative Party police and crime commissioners
Councillors in North Yorkshire
1959 births